Marriott International, Inc. is an American multinational company that operates, franchises, and licenses lodging including hotel, residential, and timeshare properties. It is headquartered in Bethesda, Maryland. The company was founded by J. Willard Marriott and his wife Alice Marriott.

Profile
Marriott is the largest hotel chain in the world by the number of available rooms. It has 30 brands with 8,000 properties containing 1,423,044 rooms in 131 countries and territories. Of these 8,000 properties, 2,149 are operated by Marriott, and 5,493 are operated by others pursuant to franchise agreements. The company also operates 20 hotel reservation centers.

Marriott International, Inc. was formed in 1993 when Marriott Corporation split into two companies: Marriott International, Inc., which franchises and manages properties, and Host Marriott Corporation (now Host Hotels & Resorts), which owns properties.

Since the founders were Mormon missionaries, copies of the Book of Mormon are provided in hotel rooms in addition to the Bible.

History

Founding and early years
Marriott Corporation was founded by John Willard Marriott in 1927 when he and his wife, Alice Marriott, opened a root beer stand in Washington, D.C.  After serving a Mormon mission in New England, Marriott traveled to Washington, D.C. where he experienced the humid summer weather of the city. Marriott was convinced that what residents of the city needed was a place to get a cool drink, and so after returning to Utah and graduating from The University of Utah, Marriott purchased the rights to franchise an A&W root beer stand in Columbia Heights. The first summer saw brisk business, but as cold weather approached they realized the seasonal nature of their business and received permission from A&W to start selling food. He named the restaurant Hot Shoppes  and watched as it grew in popularity. Always looking for new ways to improve his company, he bought the vacant lot next to one of his Hot Shoppes, removed the curb, and began offering the first drive-in service on the East Coast. This move popularized the restaurants, and by 1932, the Marriotts owned 7 Hot Shoppes in the D.C. area. In 1953, Hot Shoppes, Inc. became a public company via an initial public offering.

The company opened its first hotel, the Twin Bridges Motor Hotel, in Arlington, Virginia, on January 16, 1957. It cost $9 per night, plus an extra $1 for every person that was in the car. Its second hotel, the Key Bridge Marriott in Rosslyn, Arlington, Virginia, was opened in 1959 and is Marriott International's longest continuously operating hotel.

Hot Shoppes, Inc. was renamed the Marriott Corporation in 1967.

In 1976, the company opened two theme parks named Marriott's Great America in California and in Illinois.  Six Flags acquired the latter in 1984, while Cedar Fair has owned the California park since 2006.

Marriott International 
Marriott International, Inc. was formed in 1993 when Marriott Corporation split into two companies: Marriott International, Inc., which franchises and manages properties, and Host Marriott Corporation (now Host Hotels & Resorts), which owns properties.

In 1995, Marriott was the first hotel  company to offer online reservations.

In April 1995, Marriott acquired a 49% interest in The Ritz-Carlton Hotel Company. Marriott believed that it could increase sales and profit margins for The Ritz-Carlton, a troubled chain with many properties either losing money or barely breaking even. The cost to Marriott was estimated to have been about $200million in cash and assumed debt. The next year, Marriott spent $331million to acquire The Ritz-Carlton, Atlanta, and buy a majority interest in two properties owned by William Johnson, a real estate developer who had purchased The Ritz-Carlton, Boston in 1983 and expanded his Ritz-Carlton holdings over the next twenty years. Ritz-Carlton expanded into the timeshare market. Ritz Carlton benefited from Marriott's reservation system and buying power. In 1998, Marriott acquired majority ownership of The Ritz-Carlton.

In 1997, the company acquired the Renaissance Hotels and Ramada brands from Chow Tai Fook Group and its associate company, New World Development. Marriott International also signed an agreement to manage hotels owned by New World Development.

In 2001, the Marriott World Trade Center was destroyed during the September 11 attacks.

In 2003, the company completed the corporate spin-off of its senior living properties (now part of Sunrise Senior Living) and Marriott Distribution Services.

In 2004, the company sold its right to the Ramada brand to Cendant, acquired in 1997.

In 2005, Marriott International and Marriott Vacation Club International were two of the 53 entities that contributed the maximum of $250,000 to the Second inauguration of George W. Bush.

On July 19, 2006, Marriott implemented a smoking ban in all buildings it operated in the United States and Canada effective September 2006.

In 2007, Marriott became the first hotel chain to serve food that is completely free of trans fats at all of its North American properties.

Hotels franchised or operated by the company were affected by the 2003 Marriott Hotel bombing, the Islamabad Marriott Hotel bombing in 2008, and the 2009 Jakarta bombings.

On November 11, 2010, Marriott announced plans to add over 600 hotel properties by 2015, primarily in emerging markets: India, where it planned to have 100 hotel properties, China, and Southeast Asia.

On January 21, 2011, Marriott said that adult movies would not be included in the entertainment offered at new hotels, which would use an Internet-based video on demand system.

Effective March 31, 2012, Bill Marriott assumed the role of executive chairman of the company and relinquished the role of chief executive officer to Arne Sorenson.

In 2011, Mitt Romney received $260,390 in director's fees from Marriott International, despite the fact that he had already stepped down from the board of directors to run for President of the United States. His released 2010 tax returns showed earnings in 2010 of $113,881 in director's fees from Marriott. In February 2012, Bloomberg News reported on Romney's years overseeing tax matters for Marriott, which had included several "scams" (quoting John McCain) and legal actions brought against Marriott, which Marriott lost in court, over its manipulations of the U.S. Tax Code.

In December 2012, Guinness World Records recognized the JW Marriott Marquis Dubai, a five star hotel, as the tallest hotel in the world.

On October 3, 2014, the Federal Communications Commission (FCC) fined Marriott $600,000 for unlawful use of a "containment" feature of a Wi-Fi monitoring system to deliberately interfere with client-owned networks in the convention space of its Gaylord Opryland Resort & Convention Center in Nashville. The scheme disrupted operation of clients' mobile phone hotspots via Wi-Fi deauthentication attacks. Marriott International, Inc., the American Hotel and Lodging Association and Ryman Hospitality Properties responded by unsuccessfully petitioning the FCC to change the rules to allow them to continue jamming client-owned networks, a position which they were forced to abandon in early 2015 in response to backlash from clients, mainstream media, major technology companies, and mobile carriers. The incident drew unfavorable publicity to Marriott's practice of charging exorbitant fees for Wi-Fi.

On April 1, 2015, Marriott acquired Canadian hotel chain Delta Hotels, which operated 38 hotels at that time.

On November 16, 2015, Marriott announced the acquisition of Starwood for $13billion. A higher offer for Starwood at $14billion from a consortium led by China's Anbang Insurance Group was announced March 3, 2016. After Marriott raised its bid to $13.6billion on March 21, Starwood terminated the Anbang agreement and proceeded with the merger with Marriott. Following receipt of regulatory approvals, Marriott closed the merger with Starwood on September 23, 2016, creating the world's largest hotel company with over 5700 properties, 1.1million rooms, and a  portfolio of 30 brands. The Starwood acquisition gave Marriott a larger non-US presence; approximately 75% of Starwood's revenues were from non-US markets.

On November 30, 2018, Marriott disclosed that the former Starwood brands had been subject to a data breach. After the disclosure, Attorney General of New York Barbara Underwood announced an investigation into the data breach. The cyberattack was found to be a part of a Chinese intelligence-gathering effort that also hacked health insurers and the security clearance files of millions more Americans. The hackers are suspected of working on behalf of the Ministry of State Security, the country's Communist-controlled civilian spy agency. Initially, Marriott said that 500 million customers' personal information had been exposed. In January 2019, the company updated the number of guests affected to "less than 383 million" customers, and claimed many of the customer's payment cards had expired.

In December 2019, the company acquired Elegant Hotels, operator of 7 hotels in Barbados.

In February 2020, the company discovered a data breach that included the theft of contact information for 5.2 million customers.

In April 2020, during the COVID-19 pandemic, the company instituted additional cleanliness standards, including requiring the use of electrostatic sprayers with disinfectant, adding disinfecting wipes in all hotel rooms, and removing or re-arranging furniture in public areas to allow more space for social distancing. During the pandemic, global occupancy fell as low as 31%.

President and CEO Arne Sorenson died on February 15, 2021, from pancreatic cancer. On February 23, 2021, Anthony Capuano was appointed to fill Sorensen's vacancy as CEO and Director, having previously served as Marriott's group president of global development, design and operations.

In November 2021, the company was criticized for refusing to host the World Uyghur Congress at one of its properties in Prague, citing reasons of "political neutrality".

In August 2022, employees began moving into the company's new 21-story, 785,000-square-foot headquarters building on Wisconsin Avenue, ahead of an official opening on September 21.  The new building was constructed over four years as part of a $600 million downtown Bethesda campus, together with the adjacent Marriott Bethesda Downtown hotel.

Senior leadership 

 Executive Chairman: David Marriott (since May 2022)
 Chief Executive: Anthony Capuano (since February 2021)

List of former chairmen 

 J. Willard Marriott (1927–1985)
 Bill Marriott (1985–2022)

List of former chief executives 

 J. Willard Marriott (1927–1972)
 Bill Marriott (1972–2012)
 Arne Sorenson (2012–2021)

Awards
 In November 2020, Marriott International was named as one of the "Top 75 Companies for Executive Women" by Working Mother.
 In June 2022, Marriott was recognized by the International Hospitality Institute on the Global 100 in Hospitality, a list featuring the 100 Most Powerful People in Global Hospitality.

Finances

Carbon footprint
Marriott International reported Total CO2e emissions (Direct + Indirect) for the twelve months ending 31 December 2020 at 5,166 Kt (-1,643 /-24.1% y-o-y) and  aims to reach net zero emissions by 2050.

The Luxury Collection
The Luxury Collection is a hotel brand of Marriott International with several notable hotels including Hotel Alfonso XIII, Gritti Palace Hotel, IVY Hotel + Residences, Hotel Imperial, ITC Grand Chola, Marqués de Riscal Hotel, The Nines, Palace Hotel, San Francisco, The Park Tower Knightsbridge Hotel, Phoenician Resort, Hotel President Wilson, The St. Anthony Hotel, and Royal Hawaiian Hotel. As of December 31, 2020, there were 118 hotels comprising 23,243 rooms operating under the brand. The Luxury Collection is notable as the first "soft brand" hotel chain.

Most hotels of the brand are located in converted historic buildings, including palaces or older hotels. The brand also enlists notable designers to craft luxury travel accessories that are available exclusively on the brand's website.

History
The Luxury Collection brand began on January 13, 1992, when ITT Sheraton designated 28 of its most expensive hotels and 33 of the Sheraton Towers, as the ITT Sheraton Luxury Collection.

In February 1994, ITT Sheraton Hotels and Resorts  acquired a controlling interest in CIGA (Compagnia Italiana Grandi Alberghi, or Italian Grand Hotels Company), an Italian international hotel chain that owned several luxury properties in Europe. The majority of the CIGA hotels were folded into The Luxury Collection. CIGA's original logo, the four horses of St. Mark, was kept for The Luxury Collection brand logo until 2010; each Luxury Collection hotel now uses its own logo.

In 2011, it embarked on an advertising campaign.

In 2012, the brand announced a major expansion in Asia, particularly in China.

In 2014, the brand signed Danish supermodel Helena Christensen as spokesperson.

In 2015, the company launched a $700 million program to renovate properties.

Marriott brands

Marriott operates 30 brands internationally.

Luxury

Classic
 JW Marriott Hotels
 The Ritz-Carlton
 St. Regis Hotels & Resorts

Distinctive
 Edition Hotels
 Bulgari Hotels & Resorts
 The Luxury Collection
 W Hotels

Premium

Classic
 Delta Hotels
 Marriott Hotels & Resorts
 Marriott Vacation Club
 Sheraton Hotels and Resorts

Distinctive
 Le Méridien
 Renaissance Hotels
 Westin Hotels
 Gaylord Hotels

Select

Classic
 Courtyard by Marriott
 Fairfield by Marriott
 Four Points by Sheraton
 Protea Hotels by Marriott
 SpringHill Suites
 City Express

Distinctive
 AC Hotels by Marriott
 Aloft Hotels
 Moxy Hotels

Long Stay

Classic
 Marriott Executive Apartments
 Residence Inn by Marriott
 TownePlace Suites
 Apartments by Marriott Bonvoy

Distinctive
 Element Hotels
 Homes & Villas by Marriott International

Collections
 Autograph Collection
 Design Hotels
 Tribute Portfolio

Great America parks

Marriott developed three theme parks, of which two opened: Marriott's Great America in Santa Clara, California and Marriott's Great America in Gurnee, Illinois. A third site was proposed but never built in the Washington D.C. area, but was cancelled due to strong opposition by surrounding residents. The parks were operated by Marriott from 1976 until 1984, and were themed to celebrate American history. The American-themed areas under Marriott's tenure of ownership included "Carousel Plaza" (the first section beyond the main gates); small-town-themed "Hometown Square"; "The Great Midwest Livestock Exposition At County Fair" with a Turn of the Century rural-fair theme; "Yankee Harbor", inspired by a 19th-century New England port; "Yukon Territory," resembling a Canadian/Alaskan logging camp; and the French Quarter-modeled "Orleans Place". At the opening, the parks had nearly identical layouts.

In 1984, Marriott disposed of its theme park division; both parks were sold and today are associated with national theme park chains. The Gurnee location was sold to Six Flags where it operates today as Six Flags Great America. The Santa Clara location was sold to the City of Santa Clara, who retained the underlying property and sold the park to Kings Entertainment Company, renamed Paramount Parks in 1993. From 1993 to 2006, the Santa Clara location was known as Paramount's Great America. In 2006, Paramount Parks was acquired by Cedar Fair Entertainment Company; the Santa Clara park operates today as California's Great America. In the years after their sale, the layouts of both of the parks have diverged substantially.

Loyalty program

Marriott Bonvoy is Marriott's loyalty program and was formed in the February 2019 merger of its three former rewards programs: Marriott Rewards, Ritz-Carlton Rewards, and Starwood Preferred Guest.

Marriott Rewards was founded in 1983.

Former loyalty programs
Starwood Preferred Guest (also known as SPG) was founded in 1999 as the first in the industry to enforce a policy of no blackout dates, no capacity controls, and online redemption. In 2012, Starwood Preferred Guest began offering lifetime status and a dedicated Starwood ambassador for loyal members.

Ritz-Carlton Rewards was founded in 2010. Members were able to receive air miles instead of reward points and able to earn ten points (or two miles) for every dollar spent on any Ritz-Carlton room rates. Despite the restriction of membership to only one of the two programs, members of Ritz-Carlton Rewards were able to earn points in other Marriott hotels, while Marriott Rewards members were able to earn points at a Ritz-Carlton.

See also
 2018 Marriott Hotels strike

References

Further reading
 
 Marriott, John Willard, Jr., and Kathi Ann Brown. The Spirit to Serve: Marriott's Way. First ed. New York: Harper Business, 1997.

External links

 
1927 establishments in Washington, D.C.
American companies established in 1927
Companies based in Bethesda, Maryland
Companies listed on the Nasdaq
Companies formerly listed on the New York Stock Exchange
Hospitality companies
Hospitality companies established in 1927
Hospitality companies of the United States
Family-owned companies of the United States